Skånela IF is a sports club in Märsta, Sweden, established in 1949, mostly playing handball. The club won the Swedish women's national handball championship in 1992.

Kits

References

External links
 
 

1949 establishments in Sweden
Sports clubs established in 1949
Swedish handball clubs